Parliamentary elections were held in North Korea on 8 October 1962 to elect the members of the 3rd Supreme People's Assembly. Only one candidate was presented in each constituency, all of which were selected by the Workers' Party of Korea, although some ran under the banner of other parties or state organisations to give the illusion of democracy. Voter turnout was reported to be 100%, with all reportedly voting in favour of the candidates presented.

Symbolic significance of the leader's seat
The Kangson constituency, where Kim Il-sung applied to be a candidate of, was the area that started the Chollima movement and thus had symbolic weight in North Korean  political discourse.

Results

Elected members
The following were elected as members of parliament:

Kim Il-sung
Choe Yong-gon
Kim Il
Hong Myong-hui
Pak Kum-chol
Kim Chang-man

Kim Kwang-hyop
Chong Il-yong
Nam Il
Yi Chong-ok
Pak Chong-ae
Yi Chu-yon
Kim Ik-son
Ha Ang-chon
Han Sang-du
Chong Chun-taek
Hyon Mu-gwang
Kang Hui-won
Ho Pong-hak
Yom Kyong-jae
Sin Chung-sun

Choe Chang-sok
Choe Un-hak
Yi Song-un
Pak Se-chang
Pak Kyong-suk
Kang Yang-uk
Kim Pyong-sik
Song Tok-hun
Yi Chong-suk
Tae Pyong-yol
Yi Chang-do
Yi Ung-won
Yi Chae-bok
Yun Pyong-gwon
Paek Ui-myong
Kim Won-bin
Chon Kyong-hwa
Kim Su-bok
Choe Sang-hwa
Ko Hyok
Kim Tae-hyon
Hwang Sun-hui
Choe Kwang
Kim Chang-bong
Kim Chong-hang
Kwon Yong-tae
Kim Ung-sang
Chon Chang-chol
Pak Kum-ok
Kim Tong-gyu
O Tong-uk
Kim Song-yul
Yang Chong-tae
Pak Song-guk
Han Tong-baek
Pak Sin-dok
To Yu-ho
Song Yong
Kim Won-jom
Hwang Chae-son
Chi Chang-gon
O Rye-son
Kang Wi-jun
Choe Hyon
Kim Sang-hwan
Kim Won-jon
Ko Chong-ik
Mun Chong-suk
Yim Yun-sik
Kim Kum-san
Chong Pyong-gap
Yu Ki-ik
O Tae-bong
Yi Man-gyu
Ko Chun-taek
Yom Tae-jun
Pak Kwang-son
No Ik-myong
Hwang Chung-op
Pak Yong-guk
Kim Chang-jun
Choe Chang-do
An Chae-sung
Kim Man-gum
Yi Yong-ho
Kim Pyong-su
Kang Chun-guk
Pak Yong-sun
Choe Chun-sop
Han Chan-ok
Kim Nak-hui
Kim Hyon-su
Kim Yong-ju
Cho Myong-hwa
Son Won-dong
Yi Chong-sam
Yi Chang-bok
An Suk-yong
Yi Min-su
Cho Ung-sop
Chong Tu-hwan
Chin Pyong-mu
Kim Kwan-sop
Yi Tae-u
Pak Song-chol
Kang Chung-yon
Choe Tae-son
Pak Tong-gwan
Chi Myong-gwan
Choe Ki-won
Yi Il-gyong
Yi Tok-hyon
Hyon Chang-yong
Kim Sok-yong
Paek Son-il
O Paek-yong
Kim Tuk-nan
Yi Tan
Kim Chun-song
Sok San
Yi Chun-yong
Ko Kim-sun
Kim Yang-yul
Kim Sok-hyong
Han Tae-yong
Han Ik-su
Chong Chi-hwan
Kye Ung-sang
Yi Chan-son
Kim Yong-ho
So Chol
Yi Won-jun
Yim Pong-on
No Yong-se
Kim Tok-bok
Ko In-gol
Kim Sung-won
Yim Kye-chol
Yu Myong-ho
Kim Myong-gyong
Kim Tae-ryon
Sok Chil-bo
Kim Pong-son
Kim Song-chol
Kang U-sik
Kang Chung-han
Kang Ho-sin
Hwang Won-taek
Han Yong-ok
Yim Yong-gyun
Chang Myong-jun
Kim Yong-uk
Won Hong-gu
Kim Mu-hoe
Kim Chae-un
Kim Chon-hwang
Yu Rak-chong
Choe Chang-gol
Yang Taek-kon
Nam Son-ok
So Ul-hyon
Kim Sok-man
Kang Un-song
Yu Kon-yang
Yi Yong-son
Yon Pok-kil
Cho Tong-sop
Kim Chung-nin
Kim Won-chong
Kim Tong-sik
Song Chang-nyom
Kim Pyong-mo
Kim Tal-chun
Han Sung-un
Yu Yong-sop
Chang Kyong-sun
Kim Wa-ryong
O Kyong-ae
Kim Ok-chun
Han Sang-sun
Kim Won-sol
Kim Won-sam
Yim Chin-gyu
Paek Song-hak
Kim Pyong-sun
Chong Tong-chol
Choe Song-nak
Kim Won-hyong
Chang Chong-taek
Han Su-hyon
Pak Chong-yol
Choe Pong-sun
Mun Chang-sok
Paek Song-guk
Choe Pong-san
Kim Chin-hwa
Chu Won-saeng
Ho Pil-su
Yang Pok-won
Kim Se-bong
Kim Ok-sun
Kim Hak-sun
Yi Chae-gun
Choe Chung-sok
Kim Hung-il
Kim Sang-guk
Hong Si-hak
Hwang Hwa-bok
Kim Tong-hyok
Yi Pyong-bu
Yu Chang-gwon
Yang Tae-gun
Han Ki-chang
Chong Kwang-nok
Mun Song-sul
Kim Wal-yong
Yi Yang-suk
Yi Kwang-son
Pak Yong-song
Choe Ki-chol
To Chong-ho
Yi Ki-chol
Yang Chung-gyom
Choe Chung-san
Kang Cho-sun
Yi Sang-un
Ko Min-sun
Choe Chil-gap
Yi Song-yon
Yun Ki-bok
Yi Pong-nam
Kim Hoe-il
Kang Yong-chang
Yi Kuk-chin
Yun Yon-hwan
Yi Yon
Yim Chun-chu
Yi Yong-gu
Choe Yong-jin
Kwon Yun-il
Choe Sang-ul
Yang Hyong-sop
Pak Hong-sun
Pak Hong-gol
Chu Song-il
Pak Pong-jo
Yi Sung-gi
Choe Chong
Yi Tong-song
Choe Min-hwan
Chon Cha-ryon
Kim Mun-gun
Yo Kyong-gu
An Sung-hak
Yi Hak-pin
Kim Kyong-hoe
Yi Kyong-yong
Yi Kwang-sil
Kim Ki-su
Yi Chae-yun
Kim Yang-chun
Han Hubang-nyo
Chong Chong-gi
Pak Sung-so
Han Su-dong
Kim I-sun
Choe Hak-son
Kim Yo-jung
Kim Tong-hyon
Kim Hi-jun
Hwang Won-bo
Yu Chae-hun
Sim Sang-ui
Chang Pyong-su
Yi Mae-chun
Kang Tok-yo
Chong Ki-hwan
Kim Chol-man
Hwang Won-jun
No Su-ok
Yi Song-nam
Pak Yong-sin
Yi Man-ik
Pak Sung-hak
Hwang Chang-yop
Han Chang-sun
Yi Myon-sang
Kim Chwa-hyok
Yu Pyong-yon
Pak Tae-jin
Yi Ki-yong
Yang Chun-hyok
O Chin-u
Nam Chun-hwa
Kim Pong-yul
O Che-ryong
Yi Ul-sol
Kim Ok-su
Yi Kye-san
Chang Chong-hwan
Choe Song-jip
Yi Sun-yong

Pae Ki-jun
Chong Ki-man
Kim Kum-sil
Pak Mun-gyu
Kim Chae-gu
Han Hong-sik
Pak Yong-su
Sim Hyong-sik
Pak Chong-gin
Chae Hui-jong
Chon Mun-sop
Pak Chan-je
Yi Chan-hwa
An Yong
Yun Yong-gyong
Yi Sok-nam
Chong Chong-man
Choe Man-guk
Yi Chae-yong
Kim Chang-dok
Pak Chae-pil
Yi Tal-yong
Sung Sin-bom
Choe Sun-nam
Yim Kwi-bin
Kim Tae-hong
Chu Chong-myong
Kim To-man
Kang Uk-kuk
Pak Sung-hup
Chu Sang-su
Yim Sun-nyo
Yi Yong-sun
Ho Sok-son
Kim Kyong-in
Yu Man-ok
Kim Si-jung
Paek Nam-un
Chon Man-yong
Yi Chang-jun
Ho Hak-song
Hong To-hak
Chong Wol-san
Yi Kuk-no
Kim Sok-tae
O Hyon-ju
Pak Pyong-guk
Yi Kun-song
Choe Chae-u
Chang Yun-pil
Kim Pyong-je
Yi Hwa-yong
An Tal-su
Chong In-son
Sin Myong-chol
Sin Ko-song
Pak Kyong-sun
Chu To-il
Choe Won-taek
Kim Tae-gun
Chong Song-on
Yi Sok-sim
Kim Ki-son
Chu Chang-jun
Hwang Won-nam
Sin Chin-sik
Kim Pyong-ik
Kwon Yong-u
Choe Ok-chun
Kim Ui-hwan
Yi Yong-sun
Yun Hyong-sik
Pak Ung-gol
Kim Chae-suk
Chi Pyong-hak
Kim Myong-ho
Yi Chang-sun

References

Elections in North Korea
North Korea
Parliamentary
Supreme People's Assembly
Nort Korea
Election and referendum articles with incomplete results